Refers to the two concurrent counteroffensives in the Russo-Ukrainian War
 2022 Ukrainian southern counteroffensive
 2022 Ukrainian eastern counteroffensive

Russo-Ukrainian War
August 2022 events in Ukraine
September 2022 events in Ukraine